This is a list of cricketers who have played first-class, List A or Twenty20 cricket for Bihar cricket team. Seasons given are first and last seasons; the player did not necessarily play in all the int ervening seasons. Players in bold have played international cricket.

B
Bipin Kumar(2018-)
Babul Kumar (2018-)
Badshah lucky singh (2021-)

C
Chiranjivi Kumar(2019-)

E
Eshaan Ravi(2018-)

H
Harsh Singh(2018-)
Himanshu Hari(2018-)

I
Indrajit Kumar (2018-)
Ishan Kishan (2018-)

J

K
Kamlesh Kumar(2019-)
Kumar Aditya  (2019-)
Keshav Kumar(2018-)
Kumar Mridul(2018-)
Kundan Sharma(2018-)
Kumar Rajnish(2018-)

L

M
MD Rahmatullah(2018-)
Mangal Mehrur(2018-)
Manish Rai(2018-)
MS Dhoni(2004-2019)

N
Nikku Singh(2019-present)
Nishant Kumar(2019-present)

O

P
 Pragyan Ojha(2018-)
 Prithvi Shaw
 Pandey Abhilekh(2006-)

Q

R
Rajesh Singh(2019-)
Rehan Khan(2018-)
Rohan Kumar(2019-)
Rohit Raj(2018-)
Rajan kumar Ram (Born :- 2004 )

S
 Saba Karim (1997-2000)
 Sabir Khan(2018-)
Sachin Kumar(2019-)
Sakibul Gani(2019-)
Samar Quadri(2018-)
Sarfaraz Ashraf(2019-)
Shashi Shekhar(2019-)
Shivam Kumar(2019-)
Subroto Banerjee
Shabaz Nadeem 
SUNNY KUMAR  
Sanyukt Kumar Rai

T
 Tejashwi Yadav

U
Utkarsh Bhaskar(2018-)
surya

V
Vagish Mohan(1999-2001)
Vikrant kumar (2011)
Vikash Ranjan(2018-)
Vikash Yadav(2019-)
Vipul Krishna(2019-)
Vivek Kumar(2018-)

W

Y

Z

Bihar cricketers

cricketers